The second season of Bad Girls Club premiered on December 4, 2007, on Oxygen. Production of the season began in June 2007, and was located in Los Angeles, California. This season was the last to air 30 minute episodes, and its reunion is hosted by Star Jones. Season 2 is also the first Oxygen original series to ever break the one million viewer mark.

Cast 
The season began with seven original bad girls, of which one left voluntarily and one was removed by production. One replacement bad girl was introduced in their absences later in the season.

Duration of Cast

Episodes

Notes

References

Bad Girls Club seasons
2007 American television seasons
2008 American television seasons
Television shows set in Los Angeles